Georges-Frédéric Cuvier (28 June 1773 – 24 July 1838) was a French zoologist and paleontologist. He was the younger brother of noted naturalist and zoologist Georges Cuvier.

Career

Frederic was the head keeper of the menagerie at the Muséum d'Histoire Naturelle in Paris from 1804 to 1838. He named the red panda (Ailurus fulgens) in 1825. The chair of comparative physiology was created for him at the Muséum d'Histoire Naturelle in 1837. He was elected as a foreign member of the Royal Society in 1835.

He is mentioned in Charles Darwin's On the Origin of Species (Chapter VII) as having worked on animal behaviour and instinct, especially the distinction between habit and instinct. He is also mentioned in Herman Melville's Moby-Dick (Chapter 32) as having written on the topic of whales.

Evolution

Cuvier has been described as the first scientist to use terms "héréditaire" (hereditary) in 1807 and "heredity” in 1812 in their now biological context. He used both words in promoting the inheritance of acquired characteristics based on his studies of animal behaviour.

Although an advocate of the inheritance of acquired characteristics, similar to his brother he denied the transmutation of species. He believed that behavioral patterns in animals change over time in relation to environmentally induced needs. Historian Robert J. Richards has written that Cuvier "did not believe that the anatomical patterns of species were modified over time (though he did admit they changed in nonessential ways through the inheritance of acquired characteristics... He was a behavioral evolutionist, if a modest one."

List of selected publications 

Books
 Histoire naturelle des mammifères (4 vols., 1819–1842) (with Étienne Geoffroy Saint-Hilaire)
 De l’histoire naturelle des cétacés. Roret, Paris 1836
 
 Observations préliminaires, pp. i–xxiv in Recherches sur les ossemens fossiles, by G. Cuvier, ed. 4, vol. 1. E. d’Ocagne, Paris, 1834.

Papers
Cuvier, F. (1808). Observations sur le chien des habitans de la Nouvelle-Hollande, précédés de quelques réflexions sur les facultés morales des animaux. Ann. Mus. Hist. Nat. 11: 458–476.
Cuvier, F. (1812). Essais sur les facultés intellectuelles des brutes. Nouv. Bull. Sci. Soc. Philomat. 3: 217–218

References

Further reading

Richard W. Burkhardt. (2013). Lamarck, Evolution, and the Inheritance of Acquired Characters. Genetics 194: 793–805. 
Robert J. Richards. (1979). Influence of Sensationalist Tradition on Early Theories of the Evolution of Behavior. Journal of the History of Ideas 40 (1): 85–105.

1773 births
1838 deaths
French zoologists
French Protestants
Foreign Members of the Royal Society
Members of the French Academy of Sciences
Scientists from Montbéliard
Proto-evolutionary biologists
Zookeepers